Elections to Liverpool City Council were held on 1 November 1911.

Sixteen of the thirty-five wards were uncontested.

After the election, the composition of the council was:

Election result

Given the significant number of uncontested wards, these statistics should be taken in context.

Ward results

* - Retiring Councillor seeking re-election

Comparisons are made with the 1908 election results, as the retiring councillors were elected in that year.

Abercromby

Aigburth

Anfield

Breckfield

Brunswick

Castle Street

Dingle

Edge Hill

Everton

Exchange

Fairfield

Fazakerley

Garston

Granby

Great George

Kensington

Kirkdale

Low Hill

Netherfield

North Scotland

Old Swan

Prince's Park

Sandhills

St. Anne's

St. Domingo

St. Peter's

Sefton Park East

Sefton Park West

South Scotland

Vauxhall

Walton

Warbreck

Wavertree

Wavertree West

West Derby

Aldermanic Election

Caused by the death of Alderman William Humphrey Williams (Conservative elected 9 November 1910)

By-Elections

No. 26 Dingle, 16 May 1912

Caused by the resignation of Councillor Algernon Charles Francis Henderson (Conservative, Dingle, 
elected 1 November 1910), which was reported to the Council on 1 May 1912.

The Term of Office to expire on 1 November 1913

No. 1 Sandhills, 16 May 1912

Caused by the death of Councillor Michael Edward Kearney (Irish Nationalist, Sandhills, elected unopposed 1 November 1909)

The Term of Office to end on 1 November 1912.

No. 23 St. Domingo

Caused by the death of Councillor Joseph Roby (Conservative, St. Domingo, last elected 1 November 1909)
on 23 July 1912.

See also

 Liverpool City Council
 Liverpool Town Council elections 1835 - 1879
 Liverpool City Council elections 1880–present
 Mayors and Lord Mayors of Liverpool 1207 to present
 History of local government in England

References

1911
1911 English local elections
1910s in Liverpool